Moodana, New South Wales is a cadastral parish of Kennedy County New South Wales.

Moodana, New South Wales is north of Tottenham, New South Wales on the Bogan River.

References

Localities in New South Wales
Parishes of Kennedy County